Playgroup Festival is a festival of contemporary performing arts that has taken place in both Kent and East Sussex in England.

In addition to contemporary music, the festival has hosted comedy, cabaret and other arts and activities.

Regarded as a minor event in British culture, the festival is inspired by the creative output of Sussex and Kent, especially the City of Brighton & Hove. The organising production company, most of the performing artists and the festival crew are all based in the City. In the first four years, a majority of the attendees came from London and Brighton.

The festival has been both reviewed and awarded accolades as one of the best small festivals in the UK.

2010 Playgroup Festival

Performers 

Performers included: Los Albertos.

Theme 

Children's Books.

2011 Playgroup Festival

Performers 

Performers included: Quantic and his Combo Bárbaro, Alice Russell (singer), High Rankin, Gypsy Hill, Los Albertos, The Correspondents, June Deer, Kid Kanevil, AK/DK, Boss Kite.

Theme 

Woodland Animals.

2012 Playgroup Festival

Performers 

Performers included: DJ Yoda, Alice Russell (singer), The Herbaliser, Carnival Collective, Resonators, AK/DK, Kovak (band), Reso, Transformer, The Correspondents.

Theme 

Lost Toys.

2013 Playgroup Festival

Performers 

Performers included: Adam Freeland.

Theme 

Explorers.

Future Events 

None are currently planned.

References 

Counterculture festivals
Music festivals in East Sussex
Music festivals established in 2010
2010 establishments in England